With a population of about 120 Packsaddle Park is a small suburban neighbourhood situated to the west of Prestbury in Cheshire.  It was built in the late 1970s as part of the redevelopment of the Packsaddle House grounds that had been sold off.  Packsaddle Park has its main access from Chelford Road.  The area of Packsaddle includes the main housing estate, as well as three other houses to the east and one to the west.

History 

Constructed by JDA Construction Ltd it was completed in the late 1970s.  The main house Packsaddle House had been left for many years empty, the land was sold and in late 1970s/early 1980s the house burned down.  The only remaining part of the grounds is Packsaddle Lodge the original gate house to the estate. The estate was built as a modern executive home standard. This meant that all houses had en suite master bedrooms, double garages and all rooms have TV aerial sockets. Some houses feature swimming pools, and more recently some of the houses have been extended, this falls in-line with a lot of recent developments in Prestbury and other areas in Cheshire.

Borough of Cheshire East